The Guinea Pig may refer to:

 The Guinea Pig (play), of 1929 by Preston Sturges
 The Guinea Pig (Chetham-Strode), a 1946 play by Warren Chetham-Strode
 The Guinea Pig (film), a 1948 British film starring Richard Attenborough
 The Guinea Pig (comic strip), within the Eagle comic, from 1965 to 1969
 The Guinea Pigs, a novel by Ludvik Vaculik
 Guinea Pig (film series), a series of seven controversial 1980s Japanese exploitation gore-horror films